Sebastian Bucur (born 10 December 1996) is a Romanian professional footballer who plays as a defender for Avântul Reghin, on loan from Unirea Ungheni.

References

External links
 
 

1996 births
Living people
Romanian footballers
Liga I players
Liga II players
Liga III players
FC Dinamo București players
ASA 2013 Târgu Mureș players
CS Afumați players
CS Știința Miroslava players
Association football defenders